Walebing is a small town in the wheatbelt region of Western Australia, in the Shire of Moora, it takes its name from the original homestead established by Anthony O'Grady Lefroy in the 1840s.

Notable people
 Ben Cuimermara Taylor, indigenous activist and Noongar elder

References

Towns in Western Australia
Wheatbelt (Western Australia)